Reppenstedt is a municipality and the administrative centre of the Samtgemeinde Gellersen within the district of Lüneburg in Lower Saxony, Germany.

References